Lazare Kaptué (1939 – 12 April 2021) was a Cameroonian academic. He was active as a virologist and carried out much research on HIV/AIDS.

Biography
Born in Mbanga in 1939, Kaptué served as Mayor of Demding in the west of Cameroon. He was also a professor at the Université des Montagnes, of which he was a founding member. His laboratory was known for discovering Group O of HIV-1. In addition to his academic career, he owned a clinic in Bastos Yaoundé.

Lazare Kaptué died in Yaoundé on 12 April 2021 at the age of 82.

References

1939 births
2021 deaths
Cameroonian academics
Mayors of places in Cameroon
People from Southwest Region (Cameroon)